The 2013–14 Lafayette Leopards men's basketball team represented Lafayette College during the 2013–14 NCAA Division I men's basketball season. The Leopards, led by 19th year head coach Fran O'Hanlon, played their home games at the Kirby Sports Center and were members of the Patriot League. they finished the season 11–20, 6–12 in Patriot League play to finish in a three-way tie for seventh place. They advanced to the quarterfinals of the Patriot League tournament where they lost to Boston University.

Roster

Schedule

|-
!colspan=9 style="background:#800000; color:#000000;"| Regular season

|-
!colspan=9 style="background:#800000; color:#000000;"| 2014 Patriot League tournament

References

Lafayette Leopards men's basketball seasons
Lafayette
Lafayette
Lafayette